Esmeralda Athanasiu-Gardeev (1834–1917) was a Romanian pianist and composer.

Life
Athanasiu-Gardeev was born in Galaţi, Moldavia, in 1834. She studied music in Bucharest and then piano and composition in Paris with Julius Schulhoff and composition in St. Petersburg with Anton Rubinstein. She married Vasile Hermaziu and then General Gardeev who introduced her to Russian aristocracy. After the Romanian War of Independence, she lived in Bucharest, teaching voice, lute and piano. She died in Bucharest in 1917.

Works
Many of Athanasiu-Gardeev's compositions were based on Romanian folklore. Selected works include:

Romanian March, Op. 1
Myosotis (mazurka)
Sourvenir de Odessa (mazurka)
Polca capricioasa
Wordless romance
Scherzo
Imn hymn for mixed chorus
Collection de chansons
3 Leider

References

1834 births
1917 deaths
People from Galați
People of the Principality of Moldavia
19th-century classical composers
20th-century classical composers
Piano pedagogues
Romanian classical pianists
Romanian women pianists
Romanian classical composers
Romanian music educators
Romantic composers
Voice teachers
Women classical composers
19th-century classical pianists
Women music educators
Women classical pianists
20th-century women composers
19th-century women composers
19th-century women pianists
20th-century women pianists